Sachithra Perera (born 31 March 1992) is a Sri Lankan cricketer. He made his first-class debut for Lankan Cricket Club in the 2011–12 Premier Trophy on 20 January 2012.

References

External links
 

1992 births
Living people
Sri Lankan cricketers
Colombo Cricket Club cricketers
Lankan Cricket Club cricketers
Moors Sports Club cricketers
Cricketers from Colombo